Sarvnaz Alambeigi (born in Tehran, Iran, 1978) is an Iranian documentary film director, film producer, painter, and poet. Her most notable work is 1001 Nights Apart, a 2022 documentary film.

Life and career
Sarvnaz Alambeigi was born in the city of Tehran. She received her degree Bachelor of Arts in painting from the Faculty of Arts and Architecture, Islamic Azad University, Central Tehran Branch. She received film training from Documentary Campus Masterschool and Danish Film School. She started her art profession in 2000. In 2013, she founded her own film production company, Rabison Art. She is currently a member of Film Fatales, the European Women's Audiovisual Network, and the Association of Iranian Documentary Cinema Directors.

In June 2017, her short film Cypher And Lion (Noghteh Va Shir) was released under the production of Gallery 10.tehran. The plot depicts the fall of sculpture culture in Iran after its Islamization and Parviz Tanavoli, the father of modern Iranian sculpture, reviving it after centuries. The film was shown at the Tehran Museum of Contemporary Art after the opening ceremony for the "Lions" exhibit by Tanavoli in 2017.

In 2021, Alambeigi won the Sunny Side of the Doc prize for her global issues pitch and was later selected as a jury member for the 2022 season of prizes. In October 2021, her upcoming film Broken Flower won Saxon Award for the Best Documentary Project by a Female Director at 64th edition of DOK Leipzig.

In May 2022, 1001 Nights Apart won the VFF Documentary Film Produktion Award at DOK.fest Munich, a documentary film depicting Iran's pre and post-1979 Islamic revolution era. The film includes a focus on ballet dancers who return to Iran following exile in 1979.

Notable works

Film 
She has produced four documentary films. Her films have been screened at various film celebrations and exhibition halls internationally.

Publication(s) 

 There Between Two Worlds, her first novella was published in 2020 under Ettefagh Publications.

Artwork 

 The diary, a solo artwork exhibited in October 2021 at Etemad 1 Gallery, Tehran.
 Conversation, a performance and a solo artwork exhibited in October 2015 at Shirin Gallery, Tehran.

See also

 Iranian Revolution
 Cinema of Iran
 Masoud Sekhavatdoust

References

Living people
People from Tehran
21st-century Iranian women artists
21st-century Iranian painters
Iranian women film directors
Iranian women film producers
Year of birth missing (living people)